() is a district of the city of Quanzhou, Fujian province, People's Republic of China.

Fengze District occupies most of Quanzhou Prefecture-level City's central urban area (the place that is marked as "Quanzhou" on most maps), with the exception of several square kilometers on the west side of downtown, which belongs to Licheng District. While most of Quanzhou's historical center is in that area falling into Licheng District, most of the new developments are in Fengze District.

Administrative divisions
Fengze District has 8 subdistricts:
Xiuquan
Fengze
Donghu
Huada
Qingyuan
Chengdong
Donghai
Beifeng

References

External links
Official Fengze District Government, Quanzhou website

.
County-level divisions of Fujian